HMS Croome was a Type II Hunt-class destroyer of the Royal Navy. She served during the Second World War, spending much of the time in the Mediterranean, operating from the ports at Gibraltar and Alexandria.

Service history

Sinking of Baracca
On 8 September 1941 Croome was escorting Convoy OG 75, en route from Liverpool to Gibraltar. Baracca dived as Croome turned towards her at full speed. After two depth-charge attacks, Baracca surfaced astern of Croome, which opened fire with all guns as she went about. The Italian submarine returned fire with her main gun but the shots went wide, the gun deck was then cleared by Croomes Lewis guns. As Croome approached, the Italians began to abandon ship. Croome rammed Baracca just abaft the conning tower. The submarine sank immediately by the stern and exploded underwater. After picking up survivors, Croome headed for Gibraltar while the crew shored-up the flooded forward compartments, damaged by the ramming. A DSO, a DSC and two DSMs were awarded for the action. 28 Italians were killed.

Sinking of U-127 and U-581

The U-boat was eventually forced to surface, where she was fired on by Croome and Westcott. Westcott rammed U-581 and the whole crew were able to escape before she sank. However, Westcott ran back through the survivors in the water and dropped another depth charge, resulting in four deaths and a number of casualties.

Malta convoys

Between 12 and 16 June 1942 Croome was one of 27 destroyers and eight cruisers escorting 11 merchant ships to re-supply Malta from Alexandria. Codenamed Operation Vigorous, the convoy was forced to turn back because of a sortie by the Italian battle-fleet from Taranto and heavy air attacks.

On 4 August 1942 Croome,  and  attacked , which had been spotted by an RAF Wellington bomber near Haifa, Palestine. The U-boat was forced to the surface with depth charges and sank shortly afterwards. The whole crew was captured.

Between 13 and 14 September 1942, Croome, Zulu and Sikh took part in a night bombardment of Tobruk. Zulu was hit by shore batteries and then bombed by enemy aircraft. Croome went alongside to take off survivors and Zulu was taken in tow by Hursley, but capsized and sank  from Alexandria after further air attack.

Postwar and fate
Croome survived the war and in October 1945 returned to Devonport from the Mediterranean. She was then paid off into reserve. She was almost sold to the Royal Danish Navy in 1954, but other sister-ships were bought instead. Croome was finally sold for scrap to Thos. W. Ward and arrived at Briton Ferry, Wales for breaking up on 13 August 1957.

References

Publications
 
 English, John (1987). The Hunts: a history of the design, development and careers of the 86 destroyers of this class built for the Royal and Allied Navies during World War II. England: World Ship Society. .

 

Hunt-class destroyers of the Royal Navy
Ships built in Govan
1941 ships
World War II destroyers of the United Kingdom